Chester William Nimitz (February 24, 1885 – February 20, 1966) was a fleet admiral in the United States Navy. He played a major role in the naval history of World War II as Commander in Chief, US Pacific Fleet, and Commander in Chief, Pacific Ocean Areas, commanding Allied air, land, and sea forces during World War II.

Nimitz was the leading US Navy authority on submarines. Qualified in submarines during his early years, he later oversaw the conversion of these vessels' propulsion from gasoline to diesel, and then later was key in acquiring approval to build the world's first nuclear-powered submarine, whose propulsion system later completely superseded diesel-powered submarines in the US. He also, beginning in 1917, was the Navy's leading developer of underway replenishment techniques, the tool which during the Pacific war would allow the US fleet to operate away from port almost indefinitely. The chief of the Navy's Bureau of Navigation in 1939, Nimitz served as Chief of Naval Operations from 1945 until 1947. He was the United States' last surviving officer who served in the rank of fleet admiral. The  supercarrier, the lead ship of her class, is named after him.

Early life and education
Nimitz, a German Texan, was born the son of Anna Josephine (Henke) and Chester Bernhard Nimitz on February 24, 1885, in Fredericksburg, Texas, where his grandfather's hotel is now the National Museum of the Pacific War. His frail, rheumatic father had died six months earlier, on August 14, 1884. In 1890 Anna married William Nimitz (1864-1943), Chester B. Nimitz's brother. He was significantly influenced by his German-born paternal grandfather, Charles Henry Nimitz, a former seaman in the German Merchant Marine, who taught him, "the sea – like life itself – is a stern taskmaster. The best way to get along with either is to learn all you can, then do your best and don't worry – especially about things over which you have no control."  His grandfather had become a Texas Ranger in the Texas Mounted Volunteers in 1851 and had then served as captain of the Gillespie Rifles Company in the Confederate States Army during the Civil War.

Originally, Nimitz applied to West Point in hopes of becoming an Army officer, but no appointments were available. His congressman, James L. Slayden, told him that he had one appointment available for the United States Naval Academy and that he would award it to the best-qualified candidate. Nimitz felt that this was his only opportunity for further education and spent extra time studying to earn the appointment. He was appointed to the Naval Academy from Texas's 12th congressional district in 1901, and he graduated with distinction on January 30, 1905, seventh in a class of 114.

Military career

Early career

Nimitz joined the battleship  at San Francisco, and cruised on her to the Far East. In September 1906, he was transferred to the cruiser ; on January 31, 1907, after the two years at sea as a warrant officer then required by law, he was commissioned as an ensign. Remaining on Asiatic Station in 1907, he successively served on the gunboat , destroyer , and cruiser .

The destroyer Decatur ran aground on a mud bank in the Philippines on July 7, 1908, while under the command of Ensign Nimitz. Nimitz had failed to check the harbor's tide tables and tried Batangas' harbor when the water level was low, leaving Decatur stuck until the tide rose again the next morning, and she was pulled free by a small steamer. Nimitz was court-martialed and found guilty of neglect of duty, but due to his otherwise excellent record and willingness to admit his own fault, was only issued a letter of reprimand.

Nimitz returned to the United States on board USS Ranger when that vessel was converted to a school ship, and in January 1909, began instruction in the First Submarine Flotilla. He was promoted directly from ensign to lieutenant in January 1910.

In the latter command, he had additional duty from October 10, 1911, as Commander 3rd Submarine Division Atlantic Torpedo Fleet. In November 1911, he was ordered to the Boston Navy Yard, to assist in fitting out  and assumed command of that submarine, which had been renamed E-1, at her commissioning on February 14, 1912. On the monitor Tonopah (then employed as a submarine tender) on March 20, 1912, he rescued Fireman Second Class W. J. Walsh from drowning, receiving a Silver Lifesaving Medal for his action.

After commanding the Atlantic Submarine Flotilla from May 1912 to March 1913, he supervised the building of diesel engines for the fleet oil tanker , under construction at the New London Ship and Engine Company, Groton, Connecticut.

World War I
In the summer of 1913, Nimitz (who spoke fluent German) studied engines at the Maschinenfabrik-Augsburg-Nürnberg (M.A.N.)  diesel engine plants in Nuremberg, Germany, and Ghent, Belgium. Returning to the New York Navy Yard, he became executive and engineer officer of Maumee at her commissioning on October 23, 1916.

After the United States declared war on Germany in April 1917, Nimitz was chief engineer of Maumee while the vessel served as a refueling ship for the first squadron of US Navy destroyers to cross the Atlantic, to take part in the war. Under his supervision, Maumee conducted the first-ever underway refuelings. On August 10, 1917, Nimitz became aide to Rear Admiral Samuel S. Robison, Commander, Submarine Force, US Atlantic Fleet (ComSubLant).

On February 6, 1918, Nimitz was appointed chief of staff and was awarded a Letter of Commendation for meritorious service as COMSUBLANT's chief of staff. On September 16, he reported to the office of the Chief of Naval Operations, and on October 25 was given additional duty as senior member, Board of Submarine Design.

Interwar Period
From May 1919 to June 1920, Nimitz served as executive officer of the battleship . He then commanded the cruiser  with additional duty in command of Submarine Division 14, based at Pearl Harbor, Hawaii. Returning to the mainland in the summer of 1922, he studied at the Naval War College, Newport, Rhode Island.

In June 1923, he became aide and assistant chief of staff to the Commander, Battle Fleet, and later to the Commander in Chief, United States Fleet. In August 1926, he went to the University of California, Berkeley, where he established one of the first Naval Reserve Officer Training Corps units and successfully advocated for the program's expansion.

Nimitz lost part of one finger in an accident with a diesel engine, saving the rest of it only when the machine jammed against his Annapolis ring.

In June 1929, he took command of Submarine Division 20. In June 1931, he assumed command of the destroyer tender  and the destroyers out of commission at San Diego, California. In October 1933, he took command of the cruiser  and deployed to the Far East, where in December, Augusta became the flagship of the Asiatic Fleet. While in command of the Augusta, his legal aide was Chesty Puller.

In April 1935, Nimitz returned home for three years as assistant chief of the Bureau of Navigation, before becoming commander, Cruiser Division 2, Battle Force. In September 1938 he took command of Battleship Division 1, Battle Force. On June 15, 1939, he was appointed chief of the Bureau of Navigation. During this time, Nimitz conducted experiments in the underway refueling of large ships which would prove a key element in the Navy's success in the war to come.

From 1940 to 1941, Nimitz served as president of the Army Navy Country Club, in Arlington, Virginia.

World War II

Ten days after the attack on Pearl Harbor on December 7, 1941, Rear Admiral Nimitz was selected by President Franklin D. Roosevelt to be the commander-in-chief of the United States Pacific Fleet (CINCPACFLT). Nimitz immediately departed Washington for Hawaii and took command in a ceremony on the top deck of the submarine . He was promoted to the rank of admiral, effective December 31, 1941, upon assuming command. The change of command ceremony would normally have taken place aboard a battleship, but every battleship in Pearl Harbor had been either sunk or damaged during the attack. Assuming command at the most critical period of the war in the Pacific, Admiral Nimitz organized his forces to halt the Japanese advance, despite the shortage of ships, planes, and supplies.  He had a significant advantage in that the United States had cracked the Japanese diplomatic naval code and had made progress on the naval code JN-25. The Japanese had kept radio silence before the attack on Pearl Harbor, but events then were moving so rapidly that they had to rely on coded radio messages that they did not realize were being read in Hawaii.

On March 24, 1942, the newly formed US-British Combined Chiefs of Staff issued a directive designating the Pacific theater an area of American strategic responsibility. Six days later, the US Joint Chiefs of Staff (JCS) divided the theater into three areas: the Pacific Ocean Areas, the Southwest Pacific Area (commanded by General Douglas MacArthur), and the Southeast Pacific Area. The JCS designated Nimitz as "Commander in Chief, Pacific Ocean Areas", with operational control over all Allied units (air, land, and sea) in that area.
 
Nimitz, in Hawaii, and his superior Admiral Ernest King, the Chief of Naval Operations, in Washington, rejected the plan of General Douglas MacArthur to advance on Japan through New Guinea and the Philippines and Formosa. Instead, they proposed an island-hopping plan that would allow them to bypass most of the Japanese strength in the Central Pacific until they reached Okinawa. President Roosevelt compromised, giving both MacArthur and Nimitz their own theaters. The two Pacific theaters were favored, to the dismay of generals George Marshall and Dwight Eisenhower, who favored a Germany-first strategy. King and Nimitz provided MacArthur with some naval forces but kept most of the carriers. However, when the time came to plan an invasion of Japan, MacArthur was given overall command.

Nimitz faced superior Japanese forces at the crucial defensive actions of the Battle of the Coral Sea and the Battle of Midway. The Battle of the Coral Sea, while a loss in terms of total damage suffered, has been described as resulting in the strategic success of turning back an apparent Japanese invasion of Port Moresby on the island of New Guinea. Two Japanese carriers were temporarily taken out of action in the battle, which would deprive the Japanese of their use in the Midway operation that shortly followed. The Navy's intelligence team figured that the Japanese would be attacking Midway, so Nimitz moved all his available forces to the defense. The severe losses in Japanese carriers at Midway affected the balance of naval air power during the remainder of 1942 and were crucial in neutralizing Japanese offensive threats in the South Pacific. Naval engagements during the Battle of Guadalcanal left both forces severely depleted. However, with the allied advantage in land-based air-power, the results were sufficient to secure Guadalcanal. The US and allied forces then undertook to neutralize remaining Japanese offensive threats with the Solomon Islands campaign and the New Guinea campaign, while building capabilities for major fleet actions. In 1943, Midway became a forward submarine base, greatly enhancing US capabilities against Japanese shipping.

In terms of combat, 1943 was a relatively quiet year, but it proved decisive inasmuch as Nimitz gained the materiel and manpower needed to launch major fleet offensives to destroy Japanese power in the central Pacific region. This drive opened with the Gilbert and Marshall Islands campaign from November 1943 to February 1944, followed by the destruction of the strategic Japanese base at Truk Lagoon, and the Marianas campaign that brought the Japanese homeland within range of new strategic bombers. Nimitz's forces inflicted a decisive defeat on the Japanese fleet in the Battle of the Philippine Sea (June 19–20, 1944), which allowed the capture of Saipan, Guam, and Tinian. His Fleet Forces isolated enemy-held bastions on the central and eastern Caroline Islands and secured in quick succession Peleliu, Angaur, and Ulithi. In the Philippines, his ships destroyed much of the remaining Japanese naval power at the Battle of Leyte Gulf, October 24 to 26, 1944. With the loss of the Philippines, Japan's energy supply routes from Indonesia came under direct threat, crippling their war effort.

By act of Congress, passed on December 14, 1944, the rank of fleet admiral – the highest rank in the Navy – was established. The next day President Franklin Roosevelt appointed Nimitz to that rank. Nimitz took the oath of that office on December 19, 1944.

In January 1945, Nimitz moved the headquarters of the Pacific Fleet forward from Pearl Harbor to Guam for the remainder of the war. Nimitz's wife remained in the continental United States for the duration of the war and did not join her husband in Hawaii or Guam.   In 1945, Nimitz's forces launched successful amphibious assaults on Iwo Jima and Okinawa and his carriers raided the home waters of Japan. In addition, Nimitz also arranged for the Army Air Corps to mine the Japanese ports and waterways by air with B-29 Superfortresses in a successful mission called Operation Starvation, which severely interrupted the Japanese logistics.

On September 2, 1945, Nimitz signed as representative of the United States when Japan formally surrendered on board  in Tokyo Bay. On October 5, 1945, which had been officially designated as "Nimitz Day" in Washington, D.C., Nimitz was personally presented a second Gold Star for the third award of the Navy Distinguished Service Medal by President Harry S. Truman "for exceptionally meritorious service as Commander in Chief, U.S. Pacific Fleet and Pacific Ocean Areas, from June 1944 to August 1945."

Post war
On November 26, 1945, Nimitz's nomination as Chief of Naval Operations (CNO) was confirmed by the US Senate, and on December 15, 1945, he relieved Fleet Admiral Ernest J. King. He had assured the President that he was willing to serve as the CNO for one two-year term, but no longer. He tackled the difficult task of reducing the most powerful navy in the world to a fraction of its war-time strength while establishing and overseeing active and reserve fleets with the strength and readiness required to support national policy.

For the postwar trial of German Grand Admiral Karl Dönitz at the Nuremberg Trials in 1946, Nimitz furnished an affidavit in support of the practice of unrestricted submarine warfare, a practice that he himself had employed throughout the war in the Pacific. This evidence is widely credited as a reason why Dönitz was sentenced to only 10 years of imprisonment.

Nimitz endorsed an entirely new course for the US Navy's future by way of supporting then-Captain Hyman G. Rickover's chain-of-command-circumventing proposal in 1947 to build , the world's first nuclear-powered vessel. As is noted at a display at the Nimitz Museum in Fredericksburg, Texas: "Nimitz's greatest legacy as CNO is arguably his support of Admiral Hyman Rickover's effort to convert the submarine fleet from diesel to nuclear propulsion."

Inactive duty as a fleet admiral
Nimitz retired from office as CNO on December 15, 1947, and received a third Gold Star in lieu of a fourth Navy Distinguished Service Medal. However, since the rank of fleet admiral is a lifetime appointment, he remained on active duty for the rest of his life, with full pay and benefits. He and his wife, Catherine, moved to Berkeley, California. After he suffered a serious fall in 1964, he and Catherine moved to US Naval quarters on Yerba Buena Island in the San Francisco Bay.

In San Francisco, Nimitz served in the mostly ceremonial post as a special assistant to the Secretary of the Navy in the Western Sea Frontier. He worked to help restore goodwill with Japan after World War II by helping to raise funds for the restoration of the Japanese Imperial Navy battleship , Admiral Heihachiro Togo's flagship at the Battle of Tsushima in 1905.

From 1949 to 1953, Nimitz served as UN-appointed plebiscite administrator for Jammu and Kashmir. His proposed role as administrator was accepted by Pakistan but rejected by India.

Nimitz became a member of the Bohemian Club of San Francisco. In 1948, he sponsored a Bohemian dinner in honor of US Army General Mark Clark, known for his campaigns in North Africa and Italy.

Nimitz served as a regent of the University of California from 1948 to 1956, where he had formerly been a faculty member as a professor of naval science for the Naval Reserve Officer Training Corps program. Nimitz was honored on October 17, 1964, by the University of California on Nimitz Day.

Personal life

Nimitz married Catherine Vance Freeman (March 22, 1892 – February 1, 1979) on April 9, 1913, in Wollaston, Massachusetts. Nimitz and his wife had four children:
 Catherine Vance "Kate" (22 February 1914, Brooklyn, NY – 14 January 2015)
 Chester William "Chet" Jr. (1915–2002)
 Anna Elizabeth "Nancy" (1919–2003)
 Mary Manson (1931–2006)

Catherine Vance graduated from the University of California, Berkeley, in 1934, became a music librarian with the Washington D.C. Public Library, and married US Navy Commander James Thomas Lay (1909–2001), from St. Clair, Missouri, in Chester and Catherine's suite at the Fairfax Hotel in Washington, D.C., on March 9, 1945. She had met Lay in the summer of 1934 while visiting her parents in Southeast Asia.

Chester Nimitz Jr. graduated from the US Naval Academy in 1936 and served as a submariner in the Navy until his retirement in 1957, reaching the (post-retirement) rank of rear admiral; he served as chairman of PerkinElmer from 1969 to 1980.

Anna Elizabeth ("Nancy") Nimitz was an expert on the Soviet economy at the RAND Corporation from 1952 until her retirement in the 1980s.

Sister Mary Aquinas (Nimitz) became a sister in the Order of Preachers (Dominicans), working at the Dominican University of California. She taught biology for 16 years and was academic dean for 11 years, acting president for one year, and vice president for institutional research for 13 years before becoming the university's emergency preparedness coordinator. She held this job until her death, due to cancer, on February 27, 2006.

Death
In late 1965, Nimitz suffered a stroke, complicated by pneumonia. In January 1966, he left the US Naval Hospital (Oak Knoll) in Oakland to return home to his naval quarters. He died at home on the evening of February 20 at Quarters One on Yerba Buena Island in San Francisco Bay, four days before his 81st birthday. His funeral on February 24—what would have been his 81st birthday—was at the chapel of adjacent Naval Station Treasure Island, and Nimitz was buried with full military honors at Golden Gate National Cemetery in San Bruno. He lies alongside his wife and his long-term friends Admiral Raymond A. Spruance, Admiral Richmond K. Turner, and Admiral Charles A. Lockwood and their wives, an arrangement made by all of them while living.

Dates of rank
 United States Naval Academy Midshipman – January 1905

 Nimitz never held the rank of lieutenant junior grade, as he was appointed a full lieutenant after three years of service as an ensign. For administrative reasons, Nimitz's naval record states that he was promoted to the rank of lieutenant junior grade and lieutenant on the same day.
 Nimitz was promoted directly from captain to rear admiral. During Nimitz's service, there was only one rank of rear admiral, without the later distinction between upper and lower half, nor did the rank of commodore exist when Nimitz was at that stage of his career.
 By presidential appointment, he skipped the rank of vice admiral and became an admiral in December 1941.
 Nimitz's rank of fleet admiral was made permanent in the United States Navy on May 13, 1946, a lifetime appointment.

Decorations and awards

United States awards

Foreign awards

Orders

Decorations

Service medals

Memorials and legacy

Besides the honor of a United States Great Americans series 50¢ postage stamp, the following institutions and locations have been named in honor of Nimitz:
 , the first of her class of ten nuclear-powered supercarriers, which was commissioned in 1975 and remains in service
 Nimitz Foundation, established in 1970, which funds the National Museum of the Pacific War and the Admiral Nimitz Museum, Fredericksburg, Texas
 The Nimitz Freeway (Interstate 880) – from Oakland to San Jose, California, in the San Francisco Bay Area
 Nimitz Glacier in Antarctica for his service during Operation Highjump as the CNO
 Nimitz Boulevard – a major thoroughfare in the Point Loma Neighborhood of San Diego
 Fleet Admiral Chester W. Nimitz Gate – Main gate for Naval Base San Diego San Diego
Nimitz BEQ at the Naval Nuclear Power Training Command in Goose Creek, South Carolina 
 Camp Nimitz, a recruit camp constructed in 1955 at the Naval Training Center, San Diego
 Nimitz Highway – Hawaii Route 92 located in Honolulu, Hawaii near the Daniel K. Inouye International Airport
 The Nimitz Library, the main library at the US Naval Academy, Annapolis, Maryland
 Nimitz Drive, in the Admiral Heights neighborhood of Annapolis, Maryland
 Nimitz Lane, Willingboro, New Jersey
 Callaghan Hall (the Naval and Air Force ROTC building at UC Berkeley) containing the Nimitz Library (was gutted by arson in 1985)
 The town of Nimitz in Summers County, West Virginia
 The summit on Guam where Chester Nimitz relocated his Pacific Fleet headquarters, and where the current Commander US Naval Forces Marianas (ComNavMar) resides, is called Nimitz Hill
 Nimitz Park, a recreational area located at United States Fleet Activities Sasebo, Japan
 The Nimitz Trail in Tilden Park in Berkeley, California
 The Main Gate at Pearl Harbor is called Nimitz Gate
 Admiral Nimitz Circle – located in Fair Park, Dallas, Texas
 Chester Nimitz Oriental Garden Waltz performed by Austin Lounge Lizards
 Admiral Nimitz Fanfare composed by John Steven Lasher (2014)
 Admiral Nimitz March composed by John Steven Lasher (2014)
 The Nimitz Building, Raytheon Company site headquarters, Portsmouth, Rhode Island
 Nimitz Road in Diego Garcia, British Indian Ocean Territory, is named in his honor.
 Nimitz Place part of Havemeyer Park located in Old Greenwich, Connecticut, was named in his honor along with many other World War II military personnel.
 Nimitz Hall is the Officer Candidate School barracks of Naval Station Newport, Newport, Rhode Island. The barracks was dedicated March 15, 2013.
 Nimitz-McArthur Building, Headquarters US Pacific Command
 Nimitz Statue, designed by Armando Hinojosa of Laredo, is located at the entrance to SeaWorld in San Antonio, Texas.
 Nimitz Drive in Grants, New Mexico
 Fleet Admiral Chester W. Nimitz Statue, commissioned by the Naval Order of the United States, is situated near the bow of the  memorial on Ford Island, facing the  memorial. The statue was dedicated September 2, 2013.
 Nimitz Beach Park, Agat, Guam
 Nimitz Drive, Purdue University, West Lafayette, Indiana
 Nimitz Avenue, Mare Island, Vallejo California
 Chester W. Nimitz St., Bakersfield, California
 Nimitz Road, Dover, Delaware
 Nimitz Street, College Station, Texas

Schools

 Nimitz High School, (Harris County, Texas)
 Nimitz High School, Irving, Texas.
 Chester W. Nimitz Middle School, Odessa, Texas
 Chester W. Nimitz Middle School, Huntington Park, California
 Nimitz Middle School, San Antonio, Texas
 Chester Nimitz Middle School, Tulsa Oklahoma (Now Closed)
 Nimitz Elementary School, Sunnyvale, California
 Chester W. Nimitz Elementary School, Honolulu, Hawaii
 Nimitz Elementary School, Kerrville, Texas

In popular culture
 Henry Fonda portrayed Nimitz in the 1965 film In Harm's Way and the 1976 film Midway.
 Addison Powell portrayed Nimitz in the 1977 film MacArthur.
Byron Morrow portrayed Nimitz in the pilot movie for Black Sheep Squadron
 Graham Beckel portrayed Nimitz in the 2001 film Pearl Harbor.
Woody Harrelson portrayed Nimitz in the 2019 film Midway.

See also

 Henry Arnold Karo—see hand-written inscription on photo given to Adm. Karo
 Admiral of the Navy

References

Bibliography
 
 "Some Thoughts to Live By", Chester W. Nimitz with Andrew Hamilton, reprinted from Boys' Life, 1966.
 Potter, E. B. Nimitz. Annapolis: Naval Institute Press, 1976. .
 Potter, E. B., and Chester W. Nimitz. Sea Power. Englewood Cliffs, NJ: Prentice-Hall, 1960. .
 
 
 
 Lilly, Michael A., Capt., USN (Ret), "Nimitz at Ease", Stairway Press, 2019. ISBN 1949267261.

Further reading
 
 
 Knortz, James A. "The Strategic Leadership of Admiral Chester W. Nimitz". (Army War College Carlisle Barracks, 2012).
 
 Stone, Christopher B. "Fleet Admiral Chester W. Nimitz: Leadership Forged Through Adversity" (PhD dissertation, University of Nebraska-Lincoln, 2018)   Excerpt.
 Wildenberg, Thomas. "Chester Nimitz and the development of fueling at sea". Naval War College Review 46.4 (1993): 52–62.
 1944 interview with Admiral Nimitz from Yank.

External links

 
 
 National Museum of the Pacific War
 Nimitz State Historic Site in Fredericksburg, Texas
 "The Navy's Part in the World War". (26 November 1945). A speech by Nimitz from the Commonwealth Club of California Records at the Hoover Institution Archives.
 
 Guide to the Chester W. Nimitz Papers, 1941–1966 MS 236 held by Special Collections & Archives, Nimitz Library at the United States Naval Academy

1885 births
1966 deaths
American five-star officers
Battle of Midway
American people of German descent
Burials at Golden Gate National Cemetery
Chiefs of Naval Operations
Military personnel from Texas
German-American culture in Texas
Grand Crosses of the Order of George I
High Commissioners of the Trust Territory of the Pacific Islands
Naval War College alumni
People from Fredericksburg, Texas
People from Kerrville, Texas
United States Naval Academy alumni
United States Navy admirals
United States Navy World War II admirals
United States Navy personnel who were court-martialed

Honorary Knights Grand Cross of the Order of the Bath
Knights Grand Cross of the Military Order of Savoy
Knights Grand Cross of the Order of Orange-Nassau
Grand Crosses of the Order of the Crown (Belgium)
Officiers of the Légion d'honneur
Recipients of the Croix de guerre (Belgium)
Recipients of the Distinguished Service Medal (US Army)
Recipients of the Order of Naval Merit (Brazil)
Recipients of the Order of the Liberator General San Martin
Recipients of the Order of the Sacred Tripod
Recipients of the Navy Distinguished Service Medal
People from Clinton Hill, Brooklyn
United States Navy personnel of World War I